Keith Percy Ziebell (born 26 July 1942) is a former Australian cricketer. He was a right-handed batsman and right-arm medium bowler. He played 9 first-class cricket matches for Queensland between 1965 and 1967, scoring 506 runs and taking 2 wickets.

References

External links
 

1942 births
Australian cricketers
Queensland cricketers
Sportsmen from Queensland
Living people
20th-century Australian people